Bosh or BOSH may refer to:
BOSH (protocol), a transport protocol in computer networking
Bosh (band), a Christian rock band from Bournemouth, United Kingdom
Bosh (rapper), French rapper 
BOSH (software), a project for release engineering, deployment, and lifecycle management
BOSH!, a vegan cookery duo

People with the name
Chris Bosh (born 1984), American professional basketball player
Chris Bosh (wrestler), American professional wrestler
Bosh Pritchard (1919–1996), American football player

See also
Bausch & Lomb
Boche (disambiguation)
Bosc (disambiguation)
Bosch (disambiguation)
Bosh Berlin, an American rock band from St. Louis
Boshe